This is a list of 75 species in the genus Parthenicus.

Parthenicus species

 Parthenicus accumulus Knight, 1968
 Parthenicus albellus Knight, 1925
 Parthenicus aridus Knight, 1918
 Parthenicus atriplicis Knight, 1968
 Parthenicus aureosquamis Knight, 1925
 Parthenicus baccharidis Knight, 1925
 Parthenicus basicornis Knight, 1968
 Parthenicus becki Knight, 1968
 Parthenicus boutelouae Knight, 1968
 Parthenicus brevicornis Knight, 1968
 Parthenicus brindleyi Knight, 1968
 Parthenicus brooksi Kelton, 1980
 Parthenicus brunneus Van Duzee, 1925
 Parthenicus candidus Van Duzee, 1918
 Parthenicus cercocarpi Knight, 1968
 Parthenicus condensus Knight, 1968
 Parthenicus consperus Knight, 1968
 Parthenicus covilleae Van Duzee, 1918
 Parthenicus cowaniae Knight, 1968
 Parthenicus cuneotinctus Knight, 1925
 Parthenicus davisi Knight, 1968
 Parthenicus deleticus Knight, 1968
 Parthenicus desertus Knight, 1968
 Parthenicus discalis Van Duzee, 1925
 Parthenicus femoratus (Van Duzee, 1925)
 Parthenicus furcatus Knight, 1968
 Parthenicus fuscipilus Knight, 1968
 Parthenicus fuscosus Knight, 1968
 Parthenicus giffardi Van Duzee, 1917
 Parthenicus grex Van Duzee, 1925
 Parthenicus incurvus Knight, 1968
 Parthenicus irroratus Knight, 1968
 Parthenicus juniperi (Heidemann, 1892)
 Parthenicus knighti Henry, 1982
 Parthenicus merinoi Knight, 1968
 Parthenicus micans Knight, 1925
 Parthenicus miniopunctatus Knight, 1968
 Parthenicus muchmorei Knight, 1968
 Parthenicus multipunctatus Knight, 1968
 Parthenicus mundus Van Duzee, 1923
 Parthenicus nevadensis Knight, 1968
 Parthenicus nicholellus Knight, 1968
 Parthenicus nicholi Knight, 1925
 Parthenicus nigripunctus Knight, 1968
 Parthenicus obsoletus Knight, 1968
 Parthenicus oreades Knight, 1925
 Parthenicus pallidicollis Van Duzee, 1925
 Parthenicus pallipes Knight, 1968
 Parthenicus peregrinus (Van Duzee, 1918)
 Parthenicus picicollis Van Duzee, 1918
 Parthenicus pictus Knight, 1925
 Parthenicus pilipes Knight, 1968
 Parthenicus pinicola Knight, 1968
 Parthenicus psalliodes Reuter, 1876
 Parthenicus ribesi Knight, 1968
 Parthenicus ruber Van Duzee, 1917
 Parthenicus rubrinervis Knight, 1925
 Parthenicus rubromaculosus Knight, 1968
 Parthenicus rubropunctipes Knight, 1968
 Parthenicus rubrosignatus Knight, 1968
 Parthenicus rufiguttattus Knight, 1968
 Parthenicus rufivenosus Knight, 1925
 Parthenicus rufus Henry, 1982
 Parthenicus rufusculus Knight, 1925
 Parthenicus sabulosus Van Duzee, 1925
 Parthenicus selectus Knight, 1925
 Parthenicus soror (Van Duzee, 1917)
 Parthenicus taxodii Knight, 1941
 Parthenicus tenuis Knight, 1968
 Parthenicus thibodeaui Schwartz and Scudder, 2003
 Parthenicus trispinosus Knight, 1968
 Parthenicus utahensis Knight, 1968
 Parthenicus vaccini (Van Duzee, 1915)
 Parthenicus weemsi Henry, 1982
 Parthenicus wheeleri Henry, 2007

References

Lists of insects